The list of British Columbia by-elections includes every by-election held in the Canadian province of British Columbia. By-elections occur whenever there is a vacancy in the Legislative Assembly, although an imminent general election may allow the vacancy to remain until the dissolution of parliament. The most recent by-election took place on January 30, 2019, in the provincial electoral district of Nanaimo.

Causes

A by-election occurs whenever there is a vacancy in the Legislative Assembly. Vacancies can occur for the following reasons:

 Death of a member. The last time a sitting MLA died was Fred Gingell in 1999. In addition, elected MLA's sometimes die before taking their seats. The last time this happened was in 1924 when John McKie died before the first session.
 Resignation of a member.
 Recall of a member. This has never happened. However, former MLA Paul Reitsma was unofficially recalled because he resigned just as a recall attempt nearly succeeded.
 Voided results. The last time a by-election took place for this reason was in 1904. The most recent any election has come close to being voided was in 1963.
 Expulsion from the legislature.
 Ineligibility to sit.
 Winning in more than one district during a general election. The last time that happened was in 1921. It has been forbidden to run in multiple districts since 1940.
 A riding being established during a parliament. The only time a by-election took place because of this was in early 1934, in Columbia.
Ministerial by-election, until the 1930s an MLA's seat was declared vacant and the occupant was required to re-offer upon being appointed to Cabinet. Such by-elections often resulted in the incumbent being acclaimed.

When there is a vacancy, a by-election must be called within six months of the Chief Electoral Officer learning of it. The only exception is when a member has been recalled. In that case, a by-election must be held with 90 days.

42nd Parliament 2020–present

41st Parliament 2017–2020

40th Parliament 2013–2017

39th Parliament 2009–2013

38th Parliament 2005–2009

37th Parliament 2001–2005

36th Parliament 1996–2001

* Reitsma is a former Liberal.

35th Parliament 1991–1996

* Dueck is a former Socred.

34th Parliament 1986–1991

33rd Parliament 1983–1986

32nd Parliament 1979–1983
The Kamloops by-election was the most recent by-election won by the governing party until 2011. During these 30 years the governing parties lost seventeen consecutive by-elections.

31st Parliament 1975–1979

30th Parliament 1972–1975

29th Parliament 1969–1972
There were no by-elections.

28th Parliament 1966–1969

27th Parliament 1963–1966
There were no by-elections.

26th Parliament 1960–1963

25th Parliament 1956–1960

24th Parliament 1953–1956
Douglas Jung of the Progressive Conservative Party runs in the Vancouver Centre by-election, the first time any Chinese Canadian had run for a seat in a Canadian legislature.

23rd Parliament 1952–1953
These by-elections are held under the alternative vote system, the only two times (as of March 2008) by-elections had been held using that voting system. After the next general election, the voting system would revert to first past the post in time for the next by-election.

22nd Parliament 1949–1952

21st Parliament 1945–1949

20th Parliament 1941–1945

19th Parliament 1937–1941

18th Parliament 1933–1937
The Columbia by-election is notable for two reasons. First, it is the only one (as of March 2008) held due to a district being created during a parliament; Second, it is the last time (as of March 2008) a candidate won through acclamation.

† Won by acclamation; this date is the date of the return of the writ.

17th Parliament 1928–1933

† Won by acclamation; this date is the date of the return of the writ.

16th Parliament 1924–1928

15th Parliament 1920–1924

† Won by acclamation; this date is the date of the return of the writ.

14th Parliament 1916–1920
The Vancouver City by-election was won by Mary Ellen Smith. She is the first woman to run and be elected in a provincial-level election, which was also the first one where women could vote.

† Won by acclamation; this date is the date of the return of the writ.

~ 'Independent people's candidate', also endorsed by the Liberal Party.

* Endorsed by the United Mineworkers of America and "organized labour generally".

13th Parliament 1912–1916

12th Parliament 1909–1912

† Won by acclamation; this date is the date of the return of the writ.

11th Parliament 1907–1909

† Won by acclamation; this date is the date of the return of the writ.

10th Parliament 1903–1907
The August 16 by-election in the district of Lillooet is the last time a by-election had been held due to a voided result, as of March 2008. The November 18, 1903 by-election in Vancouver City is the first by-election held since political parties were introduced to the province.

† Won by acclamation; this date is the date of the return of the writ.

9th Parliament 1900–1903

† Won by acclamation; this date is the date of the return of the writ.

8th Parliament 1898–1900

† Won by acclamation; this date is the date of the return of the writ.

7th Parliament 1894–1898

* Result was voided.

† Won by acclamation; this date is the date of the return of the writ.

6th Parliament 1890–1894

† Won by acclamation; this date is the date of the return of the writ.

5th Parliament 1886–1890

† Won by acclamation; this date is the date of the return of the writ.

4th Parliament 1882–1886

† Won by acclamation; this date is the date of the return of the writ.

3rd Parliament 1878–1882

† Won by acclamation; this date is the date of the return of the writ.

2nd Parliament 1875–1878

† Won by acclamation; this date is the date of the return of the writ.

1st Parliament 1871–1875

† Won by acclamation; this date is the date of the return of the writ.

See also
 List of federal by-elections in Canada

References

External links
 Elections BC
 Legislative Assembly of British Columbia

British Columbia
Elections, by-elections
British Columbia, by-elections